Moccus is a Celtic god who is identified with Mercury. He is the boar- or swine-god of the continental Celtic tribe of Lingones. Moccus was invoked as the protector of boar hunters and warriors. Boar meat was sacred among the ancient Celts, and features in accounts of feasts in Irish mythology. The Lingones, whose tribal center was at modern-day Langres, were a Gaulish tribe located in the area of the rivers Seine and Marne in what is now northeastern France. They were neighbors to the Celto-Germanic tribe of Treveri. Another tribe known as Lingones was located near the mouth of the Po River in northeastern Italy, and were known for agriculture, weaving and metalworking.

There was a dedicated feast day to Moccus. He had a following in the Romano-Celtic period.

Historical attestation
The theonym Moccus is known from a single votive inscription from Langres, which reads as follows:

The name is derived from the Gaulish moccos 'pig' or 'wild boar', cognate with Old Irish mucc, Welsh moch, and Breton moc'h, all with similar meanings. The same root also appears in the personal names of a number of individuals in Gaul in such forms as Moccius, Moccia, Mocconius, Catomocus, etc.

Scholars such as Émile Thévenot and Philippe Jouët have connected Moccus with the god of Euffigneix, a Celtic sculpture depicting a torc-wearing god with a wild boar vertically over his torso. Thévenot points out that Euffigneix would have lain in the same tribal territory—that of the Lingones—as did Langres, where the Moccus inscription was found.

In The Religion of the Ancient Celts (1911), J. A. MacCulloch noted that "the swine was a frequent representative of the barleycorn-spirit or of vegetation divinities in Europe" and that "the flesh of the animal was often mixed with the seed corn or buried in the fields to promote fertility". MacCulloch speculates that it was Moccus' role as a fertility god that led to his being identified with Mercury, whose Greek equivalent Hermes was associated with "fertility in flocks and herds".

Jouët connects Moccus with the Irish myth in Oidheadh Chlainne Tuireann, in which Lugh obtains the pig-skin of Tuis, which could heal any injury. Lugh is widely considered to be the Irish form of the Celtic god Lugus, an analogue of the Gaulish Mercury.

The pig in ancient Celtic religion

MacCulloch highlights the high status and prestige enjoyed by pigs or boars in Celtic cultures, including in religious and mythological contexts:

Miranda Green considers the boar in Celtic religious contexts to represent both "war, because of their ferocity and indominability", and "prosperity, because pork was a favourite Celtic food and played an important part in feasting". Celtic warriors sported boar motifs on their helmets, standards, and carnyxes.

Modern worship
Moccus is worshipped in modern times by groups of Druids, Wiccans and Celtic polytheists.  
He is one of the main temple gods worshiped by members of the Shrine of the Irish Oak, who have assigned his feast day to the winter solstice due to his aspects as a protector, sun god, and giver of plenty.

References

See also

Gaulish gods
Hunting gods
Animal gods
Mythological pigs
Wild boars
Mercurian deities